Packington is a village and civil parish in Leicestershire, England.

Packington may also refer to:
Packington, Quebec
HMS Packington (M1214)

See also
Pakington, a famous English Worcestershire family
Little Packington, a hamlet in North Warwickshire
Great Packington, a hamlet near Meriden, Warwickshire
Packington Old Hall, 17th-century manor house situated at Great Packington
Packington Hall, a 17th-century mansion situated at Great Packington
Packington Hall, Staffordshire, a country mansion designed by James Wyatt in the 18th century